Parliamentary elections were held in KwaNdebele between 8 and 10 December 1988. A total of 54 candidates contested the 16 elected seats.

Electoral system
The territory's Legislative Assembly had sixteen elected members, together with others appointed by tribal authorities and the Chief Minister.

References

KwaNdebele
Elections in South African bantustans
KwaNdebele